Big Deal is the debut album by Brazilian rock band Black Drawing Chalks. Released in 2006, the record was produced by Gustavo Vazquez, Luis Maldonalle and the band at Rocklab studios.

Track listing
"Big Deal" – 4:12  
"Rising Sun in the purple Sky Morning" – 3:22    
"Help me" – 2:39   
"Holiday" – 3:59   
"Everything is gonna be fine" – 3:44   
"High and Smashed" – 4:15   
"A Place To Hide This Gold" – 4:34   
"Legs don't lie" – 2:37   
"Little Story" – 4:21   
"Suicide Girl" – 4:39

References

2008 albums
Black Drawing Chalks albums